Memphis pithyusa, known generally as the pale-spotted leafwing or blue leafwing, is a species of leafwing in the butterfly family Nymphalidae. It is found in southern North America.

The MONA or Hodges number for Memphis pithyusa is 4556.

References

Further reading

External links

 

Anaeini
Articles created by Qbugbot